Ferruccio Pasqui (5 February 1886 – 1958) was an Italian painter. His work was part of the painting event in the art competition at the 1928 Summer Olympics.

References

1886 births
1958 deaths
20th-century Italian painters
Italian male painters
Olympic competitors in art competitions
20th-century Italian male artists